Ashwater is a village and civil parish in the Torridge district of Devon, England.  According to the 2001 census it had a population of 651 that had risen to 673 by the 2011 census.  It is close to the Cornish border, and is about 10 miles north of Launceston.

The church is thirteenth century, with fifteenth-century windows, with an arcade that mixes the two periods. The decorated font is Norman, described by Mee as "a great treasure". The former rectory is a Grade II listed building.

References

External links
Parish website
 
 

Villages in Devon
Torridge District